The Presbytery of Abernethy is one of the forty-six presbyteries of the Church of Scotland, being the local presbytery for the area of Abernethy.  The current clerk is the Rev. Catherine Buchan, who is minister of Kingussie linked with Newtonmore & Laggan Churches. The presbytery represents and supervises twelve Church of Scotland congregations within the area. It is one of the smallest presbyteries, having only five charges within it. Currently one is vacant, and another is in guardianship

Parishes

External links 

 https://abernethypresbytery.com/

See also
Church of Scotland
List of Church of Scotland synods and presbyteries

References

Abernethy
Badenoch and Strathspey